The fourth series of Line of Duty, consisting of six episodes, began broadcasting on 26 March 2017 on BBC One. The series follows Superintendent Ted Hastings (Adrian Dunbar), DS Steve Arnott (Martin Compston) and DS Kate Fleming (Vicky McClure) as they investigate the corrupt actions of DCI Roseanne Huntley (Thandiwe Newton). Supporting characters include Forensic Investigator Tim Ifield (Jason Watkins), DS Sam Railston (Aiysha Hart) and DC Jodie Taylor (Claudia Jessie).

Cast

Main cast 
 Thandiwe Newton as DCI Roseanne "Roz" Huntley
 Martin Compston as DS Steve Arnott
 Vicky McClure as DS Kate Fleming
 Adrian Dunbar as Superintendent Ted Hastings
 Jason Watkins as FC Tim Ifield

Supporting cast 

 Maya Sondhi as PC Maneet Bindra
 Royce Pierreson as DC Jamie Desford
 Nigel Boyle as DCI Ian Buckells
 Claudia Jessie as DC Jodie Taylor
 Mark Stobbart as DS Neil Twyler
 Paul Higgins as ACC Derek Hilton
 Tony Pitts as DCS Lester Hargreaves
 Aiysha Hart as DS Sam Railston
 Vineeta Rishi as FC Rupal Pandit
 Anneika Rose as PC Farida Jatri
 Patrick FitzSymons as DCI Mark Moffatt
 Lee Ingleby as Nick Huntley
 Gaite Jansen as Hana Reznikova
 Scott Reid as Michael Farmer
 Patrick Baladi as Jimmy Lakewell
 Harriet Cains as Jade Hopkirk
 Elva Trill as Gemma Riley

Episodes

Reception
Review aggregator website Rotten Tomatoes holds an approval rating for series 4 at 100% based on 15 reviews. The website's critics consensus reads: "Line of Duty's gripping fourth season is an adrenaline-fueled thrill ride from start to finish."

Louise Wise of the Sunday Times wrote "Line of Duty is animated by a sharp intelligence in both the plotting and the writing." John Boland of the Irish Independent wrote "Line of Duty (BBC1) came to a nail-bitingly exciting end, or rather to three nail-bitingly exciting ends, two of them unforeseeable by even the most imaginative of viewers." 
David Zurawik of the Baltimore Sun particularly praised the performance of Adrian Dunbar, stating "what I love is the great moral center to the series provided by Hastings, a quirky, sometimes cranky, hard to love, but easy to admire leader of this beleaguered anti-corruption team."

Ratings
Series 4 saw a notable increase in viewing ratings from previous series, securing its largest audience as of 2017. On average viewing ratings of around nine million were achieved for the show’s first five episodes, with the series' finale achieving 10.4 million, the highest rating the show had achieved as of 2017.

Home entertainment releases 
Online
BBC Store releases for Line of Duty

References 

Line of Duty
2017 British television seasons